The Tesio Stakes, is a registered Moonee Valley Racing Club Thoroughbred horse race which is run as the Powerflo Solutions Stakes (2021). It is a Group 3 event for mares aged four years old and upwards under handicap conditions, over a distance of 1600 metres held annually at Moonee Valley Racecourse , Melbourne, Australia in late October on W. S. Cox Plate Day.  Prize money is A$200,000.

History
The race's registered name is in honour of the famous Italian horse breeder Federico Tesio (1869–1954). The sponsors of the race are usually associated with breeding and the selling of thoroughbreds since the race is for mares. Race names such as Inglis and Dalgety indicate such a trend.

From 2012–14 the race name was named after Eliza Park International, a stud farm associated with the world champion racehorse, Black Caviar: standing her sire, Bel Esprit, bred her mother, Helsinge, and stood her damsire, Desert Sun.

Distance
 1990 onwards held over 1600 metres.

Grade
 1990–1993 - Listed race
 1994 onwards - Group 3

Name
 1990 - BMW Australia Stakes
 1991–1992 - Dalgety Breeders’ Plate
 1993 - BMW Plate
 1994–2004 - Tesio Stakes
 2005–2008  - Inglis Mile
 2009 - Independent Cranes Stakes
 2010 - Tesio Stakes
 2011 - Trojan Hand Tools Stakes
 2012 - Tesio Stakes
 2013–2014 - Eliza Park International Stakes
 2015 - G1X.com.au Stakes
 2016 - Merlin Garage Door Openers Stakes
 2017 - Powerflo Solutions Stakes

Winners

 2021 - Flying Mascot
 2021 - Sovereign Award
 2019 - Amangiri
 2018 - Shoko
 2017 - Lubiton
 2016 - Kaniana
 2015 - Coronation Shallan
 2014 - Suavito
 2013 - Catkins
 2012 - Star Of Giselle
 2011 - Ocean Challenger
 2010 - Lady Lynette
 2009 - Lady Lynette
 2008 - † Miss Badoura / Bird Of Fire
 2007 - † Maslins Beach / Autumn Jeuney
 2006 - Valkyrie Diva
 2005 - Matras
 2004 - Joy Of Flight
 2003 - Zanna
 2002 - Gentle Genius
 2001 - La Bella Damma
 2000 - Oregon Steel
 1999 - Zatella
 1998 - Our Bellition
 1997 - Spectrum
 1996 - Miss Margaret
 1995 - Our Marquise
 1994 - Centisle
 1993 - Mingling Glances
 1992 - Bold Alliance
 1991 - Western Chorus
 1990 - Princess Pushy

† Dead heat

See also
 List of Australian Group races
 Group races

References

Horse races in Australia
Mile category horse races for fillies and mares